Sivagyana Munivar (c. 18th century) was a saivite sage and scholar from Tirunelveli, Tamil Nadu. He was well versed in both Tamil and Sanskrit.

Biography
Sivagyana Murnivar was born Mukkalaalingar. He translated several Sanskrit works into Tamil. He was also known as Sri Madhava Sivagyana Munivar.

Works
Sivagyana Munivar authored several texts and translated many. His magnum opus work remains the Sivagnana Mapadiam, an elaborate and critical interpretation of Sivagnanabodham, the work of the 13th-century CE scholar Meikandadevar. In his commentary to the Nannul, he revised and expanded the work of Shankara Namachivayar. Sivagyana Munivar is also known for his work Ilakkana Vilakka Sooravali, a rebuttal of Tiruvarur Vaidhyanatha Desikar's Ilakkana Vilakkam. This is perhaps the only work in the Tamil literature that serves as a refuting commentary on another work.

The following are his works:
 Tholkappiya Paayira Vruddhi
 Maapaadiyam
 Tiruthondar Tirunamakkovai
 Tirumullaivoyil Anthadhi
 Kulatthur Padhittrupatthu Anthadhi
 Somesar Mudhumoli Venba
 Ilasai Padhittrupatthu Anthadhi
 Tiruvegamparandhadhi
 Kacchi Anandha Rudresar Padhikam
 Anandha Kalippu
 Kanchi Puranam
 Mudharkaandam
 Kalaisai Padhittrupatthu Anthadhi
 Kalaisai Senkaluneer
 Vinayagar Pillai Tamil
 Amudhaambikai Pillai Tamil
 Akilandeshwarar Padhikam

His translated works include:
 Siddhanka Prakasikai
 Sloka Panchagam
 Tharkka Sankragam
 Sivathatva Vivegam

See also

 Tirukkural
 Nannul
 List of translators

Notes

References

 
 
 

Tamil poets
Tamil-language writers
Sanskrit–Tamil translators